The Heart of tha Streetz, Vol. 2 (I Am What I Am) is the  ninth studio album by rapper B.G., released on March 21, 2006 on Koch Records. The first single from the album, Move Around, features former Cash Money Records artist/producer Mannie Fresh. Paul Wall, Webbie, and the Chopper City Boyz appear on this album. The album debuted at #6 on the Billboard 200 with over 62,000 copies sold in the first week released.

Track listing

Charts

Weekly charts

Year-end charts

References

2006 albums
E1 Music albums
B.G. (rapper) albums
Albums produced by Mannie Fresh
Sequel albums